Olivér Gáspár (born 12 January 1973) is a Hungarian sports shooter. He competed at the 1988 Summer Olympics and the 1992 Summer Olympics.

References

1973 births
Living people
Hungarian male sport shooters
Olympic shooters of Hungary
Shooters at the 1988 Summer Olympics
Shooters at the 1992 Summer Olympics
Sport shooters from Budapest
20th-century Hungarian people